General elections were held in Italy on 26 October 1913, with a second round of voting on 2 November. The Liberals (the former Ministeriali) narrowly retained an absolute majority in the Chamber of Deputies, while the Radical Party emerged as the largest opposition bloc. Both groupings did particularly well in Southern Italy, while the Italian Socialist Party gained eight seats and was the largest party in Emilia-Romagna. However, the election marked the beginning of the decline of Liberal establishment.

There were episodes of violence during the election.

Background
The two historical parliamentary factions, the liberal and progressive Left and the conservative and monarchist Right, formed a single liberal and centrist group, known as Liberal Union, under the leadership of Giovanni Giolitti. This phenomenon, known in Italian as Trasformismo (roughly translatable in English as "transformism"—in a satirical newspaper, the PM was depicted as a chameleon), effectively removed political differences in Parliament, which was dominated by an undistinguished liberal bloc with a landslide majority until after World War I. Two parliamentary factions alternated in government, one led by Sidney Sonnino and the other, by far the larger of the two, by Giolitti. At that time the Liberals governed in alliance with the Radicals, the Democrats and, eventually, the Reform Socialists. This alliance governed against two smaller opposition: The Clericals, composed by some Vatican-oriented politicians, The Extreme, formed by the socialist faction which represented a real left in a present-day concept.

Electoral reform
Changes made in 1912 widened the voting franchise to include literate men aged 21, men who had served in the army or navy (regardless of whether they were 21 years old), and illiterate men over the age of 30. This raised the number of eligible voters from 2,930,473 in 1909 to 8,443,205. The electoral system remained single-member constituencies with two-round majority voting.

Parties and leaders

Results

Leading party by region

References

General elections in Italy
Italy
General
Italy
Italy